The Monqui were indigenous peoples of Mexico (American Indians), who lived in the vicinity of Loreto, Baja California Sur, Mexico, at the time of Spanish contact.

Probably first encountered by explorers traveling up the Gulf of California during the sixteenth century, the Monqui were subjected to some of the peninsula's earliest intensive Jesuit missionary efforts during the late seventeenth century. The Tyrolean Jesuit Eusebio Francisco Kino, together with Admiral Isidoro de Atondo y Antillon, unsuccessfully attempted to establish Misión San Bruno on the northern margin of Monqui territory in 1684-1685. The first permanent mission and settlement in Baja California was founded in Monqui territory at Loreto in 1697 by Juan María de Salvatierra.

In contrast to many of their Jesuit colleagues, Kino and Salvatierra included relatively few notes on native ethnography in their letters and reports. Most of what is known about the aboriginal culture of the Monqui comes from incidental comments in explorers' accounts and at second hand in the works of the Jesuit historian Miguel Venegas (1757, 1979).

Culture
Kino, with years of experience on the frontier, said that the Indians of Baja California had the most difficult existence of any he had seen. The Jesuit missionaries early perceived that the nomadic Monqui could be attracted to the missions and Christianity by the promise of food, often exchanged for work. The Monqui and other Baja Californian Indians were hunter-gatherers who harvested a wide range of natural resources from the shores of the Gulf, as well as in interior valleys and the Sierra de la Giganta. The land could support less than one person per square kilometer. Their material culture was sparse, based on what they could carry with them on their endless peregrinations in search of food.  The Monqui "had no agriculture, no fixed places of residence, no permanent or portable shelters, and little clothing -- none on men, and only grass skirts on women.  They had no boats, no pottery, and no domestic animals -- not even the dog....many of them change their sleeping quarters more than a hundred times a year."  Their social organization was based on autonomous local communities (rancherias) that sometimes were hostile to each other.  Unappreciated by the Spanish, however, the Monqui and their neighbors had egalitarian societies and were adept at using local resources to produce basketry, personal decorations, and weapons and utensils of wood.  The people of Baja California made pigments by powdering rocks and created thousands of large, elaborate, and often abstract rock paintings, some of which are preserved in a World Heritage Site of UNESCO in the San Francisco Mountains north of Monqui territory    

Traditional Monqui culture had probably disappeared before the end of the eighteenth century, under the impacts of mission acculturation and the decimation caused by Old World epidemic diseases.

Language
Of the Monqui language only 14 place names survive and the characteristics and relationships of Monqui to other languages cannot be determined with any precision.  William C. Massey (1949) believed that the Monqui spoke a Cochimí language or dialect. Cochimi is remotely related to the Yuman languages spoken in the northern part of the Baja California peninsula.  A recent reassessment of the historical evidence suggests instead that the Monqui language was distinctive and non-Cochimí, possibly related to that of the Guaycura to the south. The Didiu people who lived on the coast north of Loreto may have been Monqui or, alternatively Cochimi. 

The Baja California peninsula is a geographic cul-de-sac and the languages in the southernmost part of the peninsula (Pericu, Guaycura and, possibly, Monqui) have no known relatives. Some linguists have speculated that these people and languages date back thousands of years and that they may be the direct descendants of the earliest inhabitants in the Americas. This speculation is reinforced by their physical characteristic of dolichocephalic crania (longheadedness) which is unusual among present-day American Indians.

Population and decline
In the small and austere area they occupied the Monqui probably never numbered more than a few hundred persons.  The Jesuits recorded the names of eight Monqui rancherias but by the end of 1698, nearly all the Monqui, totaling about 400 persons, lived near the Loreto Mission.  Thereafter, their numbers decreased rapidly because of a heavy death toll from European diseases.  By 1733, the Indian, mostly Monqui, population of Loreto was only 134. By 1770 the few remaining Monqui were submerged in a population of Loreto that consisted mostly of Spanish, people of mixed races (mestizos), and Christian Indians imported from the mainland or from other parts of Baja California.

Notes

References
Bolton, Herbert Eugene. 1936. The Rim of Christendom: A Biography of Eusebio Francisco Kino, Pacific Coast Pioneer. Macmillan, New York.
Laylander, Don. 1997. "The linguistic prehistory of Baja California". In Contributions to the Linguistic Prehistory of Central and Baja California, edited by Gary S. Breschini and Trudy Haversat, pp. 1-94. Coyote Press, Salinas, California.
Massey, William C. 1949. "Tribes and languages of Baja California". Southwestern Journal of Anthropology 5:272-307.
Venegas, Miguel. 1757. Noticia de la California y de su conquista temporal, y espiritual hast el tiempo presente. 3 vols. M. Fernández, Madrid.
Venegas, Miguel. 1979. Obras californianas del padre Miguel Venegas, S.J. Edited by W. Michael Mathes, Vivian C. Fisher, and Eligio Moisés Coronado. 5 vols. Universidad Autónoma de Baja California Sur, La Paz.

Indigenous peoples of Aridoamerica
Ethnic groups in Mexico
Indigenous peoples in Mexico